Linda on My Mind refers to:

 Linda on My Mind (album), by Conway Twitty, 1975
 "Linda on My Mind" (song), from the album